Metriocnemus knabi, the pitcher plant midge, is an inquiline invertebrate found only in the phytotelma of the purple pitcher plant, Sarracenia purpurea. In this microcommunity of bacteria, rotifers, protozoa, and other dipteran larva like Wyeomyia smithii, M. knabi specializes by feeding mostly on the carcasses of drowned insects captured by the plant that collect at the bottom of the pitcher. It is found in the eastern United States, as far north as Maine and south to North Carolina.

References

Chironomidae
Sarracenia purpurea inquilines
Diptera of North America
Insects described in 1904
Taxa named by Daniel William Coquillett